Parry Sound—Muskoka is a federal  electoral district in Ontario, Canada, that has been represented in the House of Commons of Canada since 1949.

The riding consists of the Territorial District of Parry Sound (excluding the Town of Powassan, the townships of Nipissing and North Himsworth, and the part of the Town of Killarney contained in the district), the District Municipality of Muskoka, and the part of the Town of Kearney lying in the Territorial District of Nipissing.

In 2004, Liberal Andy Mitchell was elected Member of Parliament for the district, and was the  Minister of Agriculture. He was narrowly defeated in the 2006 election by Conservative Tony Clement, who was the President of the Treasury Board until November 4, 2015. In 2019, Conservative Scott Aitchison was elected.

History

Parry Sound—Muskoka was created in 1947 from parts of Muskoka, Nipissing and Parry Sound ridings.

It consisted initially of the territorial districts of Parry Sound and Muskoka (excluding the township of Baxter), and the following townships in the territorial district of Nipissing: Ballantyne, Wilkes, Pentland, Boyd, Paxton, Biggar, Osler, Lister, Butt, Devine, Bishop, Freswick, McCraney, Hunter, McLaughlin, Bower, Finlayson, Peck, Canisbay and Sproule.

In 1966, it was redefined to consist of the territorial districts of Muskoka and Parry Sound, and Georgian Bay Islands National Park except Flower Pot Island.

In 1976, it was redefined to consist of the Territorial District of Parry Sound, the District Municipality of Muskoka, and the part of Territorial District of Nipissing lying south and west of and including the townships of Ballantyne, Boulter, Lauder, Boyd, Lister, Freswick, Bower and Sproule. In 1987, the Nipissing portions of the riding were removed.

In 1996, the riding was expanded to include the townships of Sherborne, McClintock, Livingstone, Lawrence and Nightingale in the County of Haliburton. The towns of Powassan and Trout Creek and the townships of Nipissing, North Himsworth and South Himsworth in the Territorial District of Parry Sound were excluded from the riding.

In 2003, it was given its current boundaries as described above. There were no changes after the 2012 electoral redistribution.

Members of Parliament

This riding has elected the following Members of Parliament:

Election results

	

			

	

Note: NDP vote is compared to CCF vote in 1958 election.

See also
 List of Canadian federal electoral districts
 Past Canadian electoral districts

References

Riding history from the Library of Parliament
 2011 results from Elections Canada

Notes

Ontario federal electoral districts
Bracebridge, Ontario
Huntsville, Ontario
Parry Sound, Ontario
Constituencies established in 1947
1947 establishments in Ontario